In condensed matter and atomic physics, Van Vleck paramagnetism refers to a positive and temperature-independent contribution to the magnetic susceptibility of a material, derived from second order corrections to the Zeeman interaction. The quantum mechanical theory was developed by John Hasbrouck Van Vleck between the 1920s and the 1930s to explain the magnetic response of gaseous nitric oxide and of rare-earth salts. Alongside other magnetic effects like Paul Langevin's formulas for paramagnetism (Curie's law) and diamagnetism, Van Vleck discovered an additional paramagnetic contribution of the same order as Langevin's diamagnetism. Van Vleck contribution is usually important for systems with one electron short of being half filled and this contribution vanishes for elements with closed shells.

Description 
The magnetization of a material under an external small magnetic field  is approximately described by 

where  is the magnetic susceptibility.

Experimental measurements show that most non-magnetic materials have a susceptibility that behaves in the following way:
,

Derivation 
The Hamiltonian for an electron in a static homogeneous magnetic field  in an atom is usually composed of three terms

In order to obtain the ground state of the system, one can treat  exactly, and treat the magnetic field dependent terms using perturbation theory. Note that for strong magnetic fields, Paschen-back effect dominates.

First order perturbation theory 
First order perturbation theory on the second term of the Hamiltonian (proportional to ) for electrons bound to an atom, gives a positive correction to energy given by 

This correction leads to what is known as Langevin paramagnetism (the quantum theory is sometimes called Brillouin paramagnetism), that leads to a positive magnetic susceptibility. For sufficiently large temperatures , this contribution is described by Curie's law: 

,

a susceptibility that is inversely proportional to the temperature , where  is the material dependent Curie constant. If the ground state has no total angular momentum there is no Curie contribution and other terms dominate.

The first perturbation theory on the third term of the Hamiltonian (proportional to ), leads to a negative response (magnetization that opposes the magnetic field). Usually known as Larmor or Langenvin diamagnetism: 

 

Note that Larmor susceptibility does not depend on the temperature.

Second order: Van Vleck susceptibility 
While Curie and Larmor susceptibilities were well understood from experimental measurements, J.H. Van Vleck noticed that the calculation above was incomplete.

Historically, J.H. Van Vleck called this term the "high frequency matrix elements".

In this way, Van Vleck susceptibility comes from the second order energy correction, and can be written as

In this way, as the signs of Larmor and Van Vleck susceptibilities are opposite, the sign of  depends on the specific properties of the material.

General formula and Van Vleck criteria 
For a more general system (molecules, complex systems), the paramagnetic susceptibility for an ensemble of independent magnetic moments can be written as

where 
,

,

Van Vleck summarizes the results of this formula in four cases, depending on the temperature:
If all , where  is Boltzmann constant,  the susceptibility follows Curie law: ,
If all , the susceptibility is independent of the temperature
While molecular oxygen  and nitric oxide  are similar paramagnetic gases,  follows Curie law as in case (a), while , deviates slightly from it. In 1927, Van Vleck considered  to be in case (d) and obtained a more precise prediction of its susceptibility using the formula above.

Systems of interest
The standard example of Van Vleck paramagnetism is   salts where there are six 4f electrons in trivalent europium ions. A similar effect is observed in samarium salts ( ions).

References 

Atomic physics
Electric and magnetic fields in matter